Boulonnais may refer to:
 Boulonnais horse, a horse breed
 Boulonnais (land area), a region in northern France

See also 
 Bourbonnais (disambiguation)